Desfours is the name of a noble family of French descent that originated in the Lorraine, but became prominent in Bohemia during the 16th century.

History 
Their parent house is the Athienville from Luneville and Chateau-Salins. The family became official on 30 May 1634 with the declaration of Field Marshal-Lieutenant Niclas Desfours to Count of Athienville.

In the mid-17th Century, the counts of Desfours were owners of the estates Groß Rohosetz and Morchenstern. Count Albrecht Maximilian limited the inheritance of these holding to them and their lineal descendants, in 1678. From this family the countly branch of Desfours-Walderode derived. Other properties of the family included Potštát (1797), Malá Skála (1628), Semily (1634), Tanvald and Velhartice (1743).

References

French families
German families
Lorraine noble families
German Bohemian noble families
Families of French ancestry